Chalcolepidius virens is a species of beetles in the family Elateridae.

Description
The coloration may be green, blue, brown, or violet.

Distribution
This species occurs in Venezuela, Bolivia, Panama, and Ecuador, and it is widespread in Antilles.

References 
 Biolib
 Elateridae de la Antillas
 Sônia Aparecida Casari  Review of the genus Chalcolepidius Eschscholtz, 1829 (Coleoptera, Elateridae, Agrypninae)

virens
Beetles described in 1787